The following are the national records in speed skating in Estonia maintained by the Estonian Skating Union.

Men

Women

References

External links
Estonian records at speedskatingresults.com

National records in speed skating
Speed skating-related lists
Speed skating
Speed skating
Records